The Basòdino is a mountain in the Lepontine Alps on the border between Italy and Switzerland. It is the second highest peak in the canton of Ticino, after the Rheinwaldhorn.

On its summit is located a geodetic point of IGM named 05A901 Monte Basodino.

SOIUSA classification 
According to SOIUSA (International Standardized Mountain Subdivision of the Alps) the mountain is classified in the following way:
 main part = Western Alps
 major sector = North-Western Alps
 section = Lepontine Alps
 subsection = South-western Lepontine Alps
 supergroup = Catena Basodino-Cristallina-Biela
 group = Gruppo del Basodino
 subgroup = Gruppo del Basodino sensu stricto,
 code = I/B-10.II-A.1.b

See also
List of mountains of Ticino
List of mountains of Switzerland
List of most isolated mountains of Switzerland

References

Mountains of Piedmont
Mountains of the Alps
Alpine three-thousanders
Mountains of Ticino
Lepontine Alps
Mountains of Switzerland
Italy–Switzerland border